Sidney Matthew Sweet (born October 6, 1964) is an American alternative rock/power pop singer-songwriter and musician who was part of the burgeoning music scene in Athens, Georgia, during the 1980s before gaining commercial success in the 1990s as a solo artist. His companion albums, Tomorrow Forever and Tomorrow's Daughter, were followed by 2018's Wicked System of Things and 2021's Catspaw, his 15th studio effort.

Early life, family, and education

Sweet was born in Lincoln, Nebraska. He graduated from Southeast High School in Lincoln, in 1983. Upon graduation he moved to Athens, Georgia to attend college.

Career

1980s
As a high school student in 1980, Sweet wrote songs and recorded them on four-track cassettes. He joined the band The Specs and released his first recording on a battle of bands LP produced by a local radio station, and fronted his own local band called The Dialtones. After graduating, Sweet traveled to Athens, Georgia, to attend college during the vibrant Athens music scene. That same year, Sweet, who had met the band R.E.M. when they played a show in his hometown the previous year, collaborated with frontman Michael Stipe in a duo group under the name Community Trolls, as well as played guitar in Stipe's sister Lynda Stipe's band, Oh-OK. In addition, he formed another duo, The Buzz of Delight, with Oh-OK drummer David Pierce, releasing an EP, Sound Castles, in 1984 on DB Records. On the strength of this 12" vinyl, Sweet was signed to a solo recording contract with Columbia Records.

In 1986, he released Inside, his debut album, to good reviews but little commercial success. In 1989, he released Earth after signing with A&M Records; likewise, it was well-received critically, yet not commercially. This marked a personal and professional low period as his record company lost interest and his marriage failed.

1990s
In 1990, A&M released Sweet from his contract, and he signed with rival Zoo Entertainment, which evolved into Volcano Entertainment. Sweet formed a new band (which included Richard Lloyd, Robert Quine, Greg Leisz, Lloyd Cole, and Fred Maher), and together they spent that year assembling his next work, originally titled Nothing Lasts.

The following year, Sweet released Girlfriend, which was widely considered an artistic breakthrough. It quickly garnered impressive U.S. sales, spawning a Top 10 single with the title track. The music video for "Girlfriend" (heavily aired on MTV, MuchMusic and Night Tracks) featured clips from the anime film, Space Adventure Cobra, while the video for "I've Been Waiting" used clips of the Urusei Yatsura character Lum.

In 1993, Sweet released Altered Beast, an album which drew mixed reactions with its intense and brooding tracks (such as "Someone to Pull the Trigger" and "Knowing People"). The music video for the single "The Ugly Truth" (directed by Sweet) featured the singer being chased in the desert by police while driving his own 1970 Dodge Challenger, while the video for "Time Capsule" was a literary homage to Jonathan Swift's Gulliver's Travels.

In 1995, Sweet released 100% Fun, an alt-rock album best known for its lead-off track, the self-deprecating "Sick of Myself". The album itself fared better commercially, and even made it onto Entertainment Weekly critic David Browne's year's-best list.

In 1997, Sweet released Blue Sky on Mars, a new-wave album which featured the synth-laden singles "Where You Get Love" and "Come to California". The music video for the former featured Sweet as an astronaut traveling through outer space.

In 1998 his version of Walter Egan's Magnet and Steel was recorded on the Sabrina The Teenage Witch album with Lindsey Buckingham on guitar.

In 1999, Sweet released In Reverse, a psychedelic album which featured Wall of Sound singles "What Matters" and "Trade Places". The album is noteworthy for its 10-minute closing track, "Thunderstorm", a combination of several demos.

2000s

In 2000, Sweet released Time Capsule: Best of 90/00, a retrospective compilation which featured two new tracks.

In 2001, Sweet and Darius Rucker performed The Beach Boys song "Sail On, Sailor" on the special A Tribute to Brian Wilson; the musicians later performed the same song with Brian Wilson himself on Late Show with David Letterman.

In 2002, Sweet released To Understand: The Early Recordings of Matthew Sweet, a retrospective compilation which featured unreleased material. Also that year, he formed the supergroup The Thorns with Shawn Mullins and Pete Droge.

In 2003, Sweet released Kimi Ga Suki, a garage-rock album initially released in Japan, where Sweet has a following.

In 2004, he released Living Things, an acoustic album mainly consisted of material he wrote while recording w/ The Thorns.

In 2006, Sweet and Susanna Hoffs released Under the Covers, Vol. 1, which featured covers of popular 1960s songs.

In 2008, Sweet released Sunshine Lies, his 10th studio album, which also incorporated a 2-LP set featuring 4 bonus tracks.

In 2009, Sweet and Hoffs released Under the Covers, Vol. 2, which featured covers of popular 1970s songs.

2010s
In 2010, the musical Girlfriend, using songs from Sweet's eponymous album, was staged by the Berkeley Repertory Theatre.

In 2011, Sweet released Modern Art, a labyrinthine album which featured the single, "She Walks the Night".

In 2012, Sweet celebrated the 20th anniversary of Girlfriend with a tour performing the entire album from start to finish.

In 2013, Sweet and Susanna Hoffs released Under the Covers, Vol. 3, which features covers of popular 1980s songs.

In 2014, Sweet was featured on The Simpsons, the longest-running American sitcom. He wrote "Hopin' for a Dream", a song by fictitious 1980s band SunGazer, in the episode. Sweet and his wife Lisa were also research consultants for the Tim Burton film Big Eyes, a biography on painter Margaret Keane.

In 2015, Sweet and Susanna Hoffs released Completely Under the Covers, a limited 4-disc box set of all three Under the Covers albums, with 15 bonus tracks.

In 2017, Sweet released Tomorrow Forever, a rootsy album funded entirely by fans on Kickstarter; over the course of one month in 2014, the project exceeded its $32,000 goal by 75% from fewer than 800 backers.

In 2018, Sweet released Tomorrow's Daughter on May 18, a companion album to Tomorrow Forever.  Also that year, Sweet was paid tribute in the compilation album, "Altered Sweet", which included artists such as Lisa Mychols, Andy Reed, Greg Pope, Nick Bertling, Fireking, Chris Richards & The Subtractions, simple friend, Michael Simmons, Gretchen's Wheel, The Well Wishers, Elvyn, Pop Co-Op, Stabby Robot, Lannie Flowers, Stereo Tiger, Michael Carpenter, Phil Ajjarapu, CokeRoque, Donny Brown, Nick Piunti, Paranoid Lovesick, Trolley, Keith Klingensmith, Arvidson & Butterflies, Robyn Gibson and Popdudes. Also that year, independent vinyl reissue label Intervention Records announced it would release Artist-Approved 2 LP Expanded Editions of 100% Fun, Altered Beast, and Girlfriend on vinyl and CD/SACD, along with a vinyl reissue of Son of Altered Beast. On Record Store Day's Black Friday, he released Wicked System of Things, a tribute to midwestern power pop, and a 3-inch colored vinyl of a live 1997 recording from Disney Orlando's Pleasure Island for Record Store Day in 2019.

2020s
In 2021, Sweet released Catspaw, his 15th studio album, and the first to feature Sweet playing all lead guitar parts.

Personal life

Sweet and his wife Lisa have resided in Omaha, Nebraska since 2013. He was married at least once before; a 1989 divorce strongly inspired the songs on Sweet's commercial breakthrough album Girlfriend.

Sweet is a member of the Canadian charity Artists Against Racism.

Discography

 Inside (1986)
 Earth (1989)
 Girlfriend (1991)
 Altered Beast (1993)
 100% Fun (1995)
 Blue Sky on Mars (1997)
 In Reverse (1999)
 Kimi Ga Suki (2003)
 Living Things (2004)
 Under the Covers, Vol. 1 (with Susanna Hoffs) (2006)
 Sunshine Lies (2008)
 Under the Covers, Vol. 2 (with Susanna Hoffs) (2009)
 Modern Art (2011)
 Under the Covers, Vol. 3 (with Susanna Hoffs) (2013)
 Tomorrow Forever (2017)
 Tomorrow's Daughter (2018)
 Wicked System of Things (2018)
 Catspaw (2021)

Film and television

Tributes and benefits

Other appearances 

 In 1983, Sweet was an extra in the film, Terms of Endearment, in a scene featuring Debra Winger and Jeff Daniels at the University of Nebraska.
 In 1985, Sweet contributed a cover of the dB's "Ask for Jill" (with Don Dixon and Chris Stamey) for the Hoboken anthology, Luxury Condos Coming to Your Neighborhood Soon.
 In 1986, Sweet contributed lyrics and vocals to the song, "Something Becomes Nothing", for The Golden Palominos album, Blast of Silence and played with the band during a 1987 concert tour.
 In 1988, Sweet co-wrote (with Jules Shear) the title track to the final 'Til Tuesday album, Everything's Different Now.
 In 1991, Sweet contributed bass guitar to Lloyd Cole's cover of "Chelsea Hotel" for the tribute album, I'm Your Fan: The Songs of Leonard Cohen, and also toured with his band, Lloyd Cole and the Commotions.
 In 1992, Sweet was featured on an episode of the series, 120 Minutes, hosted by VJ Dave Kendall, which included an interview and live performance.
 In 1992, Sweet played bass on the album To Hell With Love by Suzanne Rhatigan, which was produced by Sweet's Girlfriend producer Fred Maher and also featured Sweet's guitarist Robert Quine.
 In 1994, Sweet co-produced the Velvet Crush album, Teenage Symphonies to God.
 In 1995, Sweet appeared on an episode of the series, Space Ghost Coast to Coast. That same year, he was featured on an episode of VH1 Duets with John Hiatt, and also contributed guitar and vocals to the song, "She's Not in Love", on the Kim Stockwood album, Bonavista.
 In 1996, Sweet contributed bass guitar to the song, "Are You Ready for the Fallout?", on the Fastball debut album. Also, Sweet provided backing vocals for Kris McKay in a cover of his own song, "How Cool", on her album, Things That Show.
 In 1997, Sweet was the subject for Matthew Sweet: On the Edge, a documentary produced by NPTV (Nebraska Public Television). Also that year, Sweet contributed vocals to the song, "Sixteen Down", on the Jayhawks album, Sound of Lies.
 Also in 1997 he appeared in  Austin Powers: International Man of Mystery. as a performer in Austin's band Ming Tea playing during the closing credits of the movie.
 In 1998, Sweet appeared on an episode of the series, The Drew Carey Show, as a musician auditioning to be in Carey's band.
 In 1999, Sweet co-produced (and co-wrote two songs) on the Velvet Crush album, Free Expression.
 In 2000, Sweet contributed lyrics and vocals to the song, "Daylight", on the Delerium album, Poem. Also that year, he appeared on the game show, Win Ben Stein's Money, as a contestant playing for Alzheimer's.
 In 2001, Sweet was interviewed for the book, Behind The Muse: Pop and Rock's Greatest Songwriters Talk About Their Work and Inspiration.
 In 2002, Sweet contributed vocals to the title track of the Counting Crows album, Hard Candy.
 In 2003, Sweet co-wrote the song, "Stumbling Through the Dark", for the Jayhawks album, Rainy Day Music.
 In 2004, Sweet co-wrote the title track to the Hanson album, Underneath.
 In 2008, Sweet was featured in Mellodrama, a documentary about the Mellotron. Also, he produced The Bridges debut album, Limits of the Sky.
 In 2010, Sweet was featured on an episode of Stripped Down Live With Curt Smith, which included an interview and live performance.
 In 2011, Sweet performed the Big Star song, "September Gurls", with Mike Mills at a tribute concert to Alex Chilton. Also, he co-produced The Bangles comeback album, Sweetheart of the Sun.
 In 2012, Sweet was the subject for an episode of On Canvas, an Emmy-winning music program which fuses stage performances with interviews.
 In 2013, Sweet performed the Beatles songs, "Nowhere Man" and "Day Tripper", along with the Wild Honey Orchestra (featuring Rusty Anderson) at a tribute benefit for autism. That same year, he contributed bass to the Lloyd Cole album, Standards.
In 2013, Sweet collaborated with Tim Robbins and Susanna Hoffs for a cover of the traditional "Marianne" for the sea shanty-compilation Son of Rogues Gallery: Pirate Ballads, Sea Songs & Chanteys.
In 2020, Sweet contributed guitar and backing vocals to a new version of Badfinger's "Baby Blue" for the band's sole surviving member, Joey Molland.
In 2022, Sweet published an unreleased cover demo of Kate Bush's 1978 single, Wuthering Heights (song), on his YouTube channel.

References

External links

 

 
 

 
1964 births
20th-century American singers
21st-century American singers
American male singer-songwriters
American multi-instrumentalists
Living people
Musicians from Lincoln, Nebraska
Power pop musicians
The Golden Palominos members
Guitarists from Nebraska
Musicians from Athens, Georgia
20th-century American guitarists
American male guitarists
The Thorns members
Singer-songwriters from Georgia (U.S. state)
Singer-songwriters from Nebraska
Ming Tea members
American alternative rock musicians